Ivan Ivanović (born 14 September 1989) is a Montenegrin international footballer who plays for Jedinstvo Bijelo Polje in the Montenegrin Second League as a left winger.

Club career
Born in Bijelo Polje, Ivanović has played for Zora, Jezero, Bar, Čelik Nikšić and Rudar Pljevlja as well as abroad in Kazakhstan, North Macedonia and the Faroe Islands.

International career
Ivanović made his debut for Montenegro in a November 2013 friendly match against Luxembourg, coming on as a late substitute for Nemanja Nikolić. It remained his sole international appearance.

Personal life
Ivanović's brother Igor is also a professional footballer, who has played for Zira in the Azerbaijan Premier League.

References

1989 births
Living people
People from Bijelo Polje
Association football wingers
Montenegrin footballers
Montenegro international footballers
FK Zora players
FK Jezero players
OFK Bar players
FK Čelik Nikšić players
FK Rudar Pljevlja players
FC Atyrau players
OFK Titograd players
FK Mornar players
FK Pobeda players
Tvøroyrar Bóltfelag players
FK Lovćen players
FK Jedinstvo Bijelo Polje players
Montenegrin Second League players
Montenegrin First League players
Kazakhstan Premier League players
Macedonian First Football League players
Faroe Islands Premier League players
Montenegrin expatriate footballers
Expatriate footballers in Kazakhstan
Montenegrin expatriate sportspeople in Kazakhstan
Expatriate footballers in North Macedonia
Montenegrin expatriate sportspeople in North Macedonia
Expatriate footballers in the Faroe Islands
Montenegrin expatriate sportspeople in the Faroe Islands